Kicking Against the Pricks is the third album released by the rock music group Nick Cave and the Bad Seeds. First released in 1986, the album is a collection of Cave's interpretations of songs by other artists. The title is a reference to a biblical quote from the King James version of the Bible, Acts 26, verse 14.

The album marked the Bad Seeds debut of drummer Thomas Wydler, expanding the Bad Seeds line-up to Cave (vocals and keyboards), Wydler, bassist Barry Adamson, and guitarists Mick Harvey and Blixa Bargeld. 

Cave would later downplay the importance of the record, but said it helped the band develop musically:

Remarking on the song selection, Cave said:

The strings were arranged by Harvey and played by the Berliner Kaffeehausmusik Ensemble. "The Hammer Song" is not to be confused with the song of the same name from the 1990 Bad Seeds album The Good Son.

The album was remastered and reissued on 27 April 2009 as a collector's edition CD/DVD set. The CD features the original 12-song vinyl LP's track listing, while "Black Betty" and "Running Scared" are featured as bonus audio tracks on the accompanying DVD.

Recordings of seven of these songs, performed by the original artists, were later issued on the Original Seeds compilation CDs.

Track listing

Vinyl version 
"Muddy Water" – 5:15 (Phil Rosenthal)
 Nick Cave – lead vocals, organ, piano interior
 Blixa Bargeld – guitar
 Mick Harvey – piano, backing vocals
 Barry Adamson – bass, backing vocals
 Thomas Wydler – drums
 + Dawn Cave – violin
"I'm Gonna Kill That Woman" – 3:44 (John Lee Hooker)
 Nick Cave – lead vocals
 Blixa Bargeld – guitar
 Mick Harvey – bass, drums
 + Hugo Race – guitar
"Sleeping Annaleah" – 3:18 (Mickey Newbury, Dan Folger)
 Nick Cave – lead vocals
 Blixa Bargeld – slide guitar
 Mick Harvey – piano, backing vocals, acoustic guitar
 Barry Adamson – bass, backing vocals
 Thomas Wydler – drums
"Long Black Veil" – 3:46 (Danny Dill, Marijohn Wilkin)
 Nick Cave – lead vocals
 Blixa Bargeld – slide guitar, backing vocals
 Mick Harvey – acoustic guitar, backing vocals, snare
 Barry Adamson – bass, backing vocals
 Thomas Wydler – percussion
 + Hugo Race – guitar
"Hey Joe" – 3:56 (Billy Roberts)
 Nick Cave – lead vocals, organ
 Mick Harvey – drums, piano
 + Hugo Race – guitar
 + Tracy Pew – bass
"The Singer" (a.k.a. The Folksinger) – 3:09 (Johnny Cash, Charlie Daniels)
 Nick Cave – lead vocals
 Mick Harvey – guitar
 Barry Adamson – bass
 Thomas Wydler – drums
"All Tomorrow's Parties" – 5:52 (Lou Reed)
 Nick Cave – lead vocals
 Blixa Bargeld – guitar, co-lead vocals
 Mick Harvey – guitar, co-lead vocals, piano
 Barry Adamson – bass
 Thomas Wydler – drums
 + Rowland S. Howard – co-lead vocals
"By the Time I Get to Phoenix" – 3:39 (Jimmy Webb)
 Nick Cave – lead vocals
 Blixa Bargeld – guitar
 Mick Harvey – piano
 Barry Adamson – bass
 Thomas Wydler – drums
 + Rowland S. Howard – guitar, organ
"The Hammer Song" – 3:50 (Alex Harvey)
 Nick Cave – lead vocals
 Blixa Bargeld – guitar
 Mick Harvey – organ, snare drum
 Barry Adamson – bass
 Thomas Wydler – drums
"Something's Gotten Hold of My Heart" – 3:44 (Roger Greenaway, Roger Cook)
 Nick Cave – lead vocals
 Mick Harvey – piano, backing vocals, vibes
 Barry Adamson – bass, backing vocals
 Thomas Wydler – drums
"Jesus Met the Woman at the Well" – 2:00 (Traditional, Arranged The Alabama Singers)
 Nick Cave – lead vocals
 Blixa Bargeld – guitar, co-lead vocals
 Mick Harvey – guitar, co-lead vocals
 Barry Adamson – bass, co-lead vocals
 Thomas Wydler – drums
"The Carnival Is Over" – 3:16 (Tom Springfield)
 Nick Cave – lead vocals
 Blixa Bargeld – guitar, co-lead vocals
 Mick Harvey – piano, co-lead vocals
 Barry Adamson – bass, co-lead vocals
 Thomas Wydler – drums

CD version 

 "Muddy Water"
 "I'm Gonna Kill That Woman"
 "Sleeping Annaleah"
 "Long Black Veil"
 "Hey Joe"
 "The Singer (a.k.a. The Folksinger)"
 "Black Betty" (Leadbelly)
 "Running Scared" (Roy Orbison, Joe Melson)
 "All Tomorrow's Parties"
 "By the Time I Get to Phoenix"
 "The Hammer Song"
 "Something's Gotten Hold of My Heart"
 "Jesus Met the Woman at the Well"
 "The Carnival Is Over"

Track listing errors
Some of the songs were re-titled (possibly through error), and one was miscredited, as follows:1. "Muddy Water" by Phil Rosenthal. On the Cave LP the song is credited to John Bundrick, who wrote a song of the same title, recorded by the band Free. Previously recorded by The Seldom Scene, and Johnny Cash.
3. "Sleeping Annaleah" is the song "Weeping Annaleah", previously recorded by Tom Jones.
6. "The Singer" is the song "The Folk Singer", previously recorded by Tommy Roe, Johnny Cash, Glen Campbell, and Burl Ives.
7. "Black Betty" is actually three songs recorded by Leadbelly as a medley: "Looky Looky Yonder/Black Betty/Yellow Women's Doorbells".
 12. "The Carnival Is Over" was not co-written by Frank Farian; this credit appears as a consequence of his creating an extra verse for Boney M's cover of the song.
13. "Jesus Met the Woman at the Well" is credited as "Traditional, Arranged The Alabama Singers". While this song was recorded by The Alabama Singers, it follows the arrangement of an earlier recording by The Pilgrim Travelers, which is credited as "Traditional, Arranged J. W. Alexander".

Singles
 "The Singer" (MUTE 47) (16 June 1986)
 b/w: "Running Scared" / "Black Betty"

Chart positions

References

1986 albums
Nick Cave albums
Mute Records albums
Albums produced by Flood (producer)
Albums produced by Tony Cohen
Covers albums